is a general hospital in Fujisawa, Kanagawa, Japan. Founded in 1971, the hospital is also a district hospital serving the neighbouring cities of Chigasaki and Kamakura.

Facilities and operations
Fujisawa City Hospital has 536 beds, and treated 173,077 inpatients and 357,994 outpatients in fiscal 2011. The hospital is also a teaching facility for medical professionals including resident physicians and nurses.

Departments include Cardiology, Respiratory medicine, Gastrointestinal medicine, Nephrology, Nurology, Endocrine/Diabetes internal medicine, Hematology and Rheumatology, Psychiatrics, Dermatology, Orthopedics, Ophthalmology, Otolaryngology, Surgery, Neurosurgery, Plastic surgery, Rehabilitation, Diagnostic pathology, Radiology, Dentistry, Anesthesiology, Pediatrics, Comprehensive medical care, Children's medical examination center and Emergency Center.

References

External links

Hospital buildings completed in 1971
Hospitals in Kanagawa Prefecture
Hospitals established in 1971
1971 establishments in Japan
Buildings and structures in Fujisawa, Kanagawa